Pyruvate dehydrogenase kinase isoform 2 (PDK2) also known as pyruvate dehydrogenase lipoamide kinase isozyme 2, mitochondrial is an enzyme that in humans is encoded by the PDK2 gene. PDK2 is an isozyme of pyruvate dehydrogenase kinase.

Structure

The protein encoded by the PDK2 gene has two sites, an active site and an allosteric site that allow for the activity and regulation of this enzyme. There are many structural motifs that are important to the regulation of this enzyme. Nov3r and AZ12 inhibitors bind at the lipoamide binding site that is located at one end of the R domain. Pfz3 binds in an extended site at the other end of the R domain. One inhibitor, dicholoroacetate (DCA), binds at the center of the R domain. Within the active site, there are three amino acid residues, R250, T302, and Y320, that make the kinase resistant to the inhibitor dichloroacetate, which uncouples the active site from the allosteric site. This supports the theory that R250, T302, and Y320 stabilize the "open" and "closed" conformations of the built-in lid that controls the access of a nucleotide into the nucleotide-binding cavity. This strongly suggests that the mobility of ATP lid is central to the allosteric regulation of  PDHK2 activity serving as a conformational switch required for communication between the active site and allosteric sites in the kinase molecule. There is also a DW-motif that is crucial in mediating DCA, nucleotide, and lipoyl domain binding site communication. This network is responsible for rendering PDK2 locked in the closed, or inactive conformation.

Function 
The Pyruvate Dehydrogenase (PDH) complex must be tightly regulated due to its central role in general metabolism. Within the complex, there are three serine residues on the E1 component that are sites for phosphorylation; this phosphorylation inactivates the complex. In humans, there have been four isozymes of Pyruvate Dehydrogenase Kinase that have been shown to phosphorylate these three sites: PDK1, PDK2, PDK3, and PDK4. PDK2 has been identified as the most abundant isoform in human tissues. Through many studies, it has been made clear that the activity of this enzyme is essential, even at rest, to regulate glycolysis/carbodydrate oxidation and producing metabolites for oxidative phosphorylation and the electron transport chain. These studies have illustrated that the kinetics of the PDK isoform population, specifically PDK2, is more important in determining PDH activity than measuring PDK activity.

Regulation
As the primary regulators of a crucial step in the central metabolic pathway, the pyruvate dehydrogenase family is tightly regulated itself by a myriad of factors. PDK2 activity is modulated by low levels of hydrogen peroxide; this happens because the compound temporarily oxidizes the cysteine residues 45 and 392 on the enzyme, resulting in an inactive PDK2 and greater PDH activity. These conditions also inactivate the TCA cycle, the next step in aerobic respiration. This alludes to the fact that when there is a high level of O2 production in the mitochondria, which may occur because of nutrient excess, the increase in the products serve as a negative feedback that control mitochondria metabolism.
PDK2, in conjunction with PDK3 and PDK4, are primary targets of Peroxisome proliferator-activated receptor delta or beta, with PDK2 having two elements that respond to these receptors.

Clinical significance
All of the pyruvate dehydrogenase isozymes have been associated with various metabolic disorders, including diabetes. This is due to a mechanism by which consistently elevated free fatty acid levels stimulate the PDK enzymes, particularly, PDK2 and PDK4 in the liver. In stimulating this activity, there is less PDH activity, and therefore less glucose uptake.

Cancer
As the PDK enzymes are associated with central metabolism and growth, they are often associated with various mechanisms of cancer progression. Enhanced PDK2 activity leads to increased glycolysis and lactic acid production, known as the Warburg effect. In some studies, the wild-type form of tumor protein p53 prevents manifestation of tumorigenesis by regulating PDK2 activity.
Additionally, inhibition of PDK2 subsequently inhibits HIF1A in cancer cells by both a prolyl-hydroxylase (PHD)-dependent mechanism and a PHD-independent mechanism. Therefore, mitochondria-targeting metabolic modulators increase pyruvate dehydrogenase activity, and suppress angiogenesis as well, normalizing the pseudo-hypoxic signals that lead to normoxic HIF1A activation in solid tumors.

References

Further reading 

 
 
 
 
 
 
 
 
 
 
 
 
 
 
 

EC 2.7.11